Cosh may refer to:

People
 Chris Cosh (born 1959), American football coach
 John Cosh (1915–2005), British rheumatologist

Science, technology, and mathematics
 cosh (mathematical function), hyperbolic cosine, a mathematical function with notation cosh(x)
 -COSH, a representation of the thiocarboxylic acid functional group in chemistry
 Chlorpromazine, an antipsychotic drug
 ChromeOS Shell, an operating system designed by Google

Weaponry
 Baton (law enforcement)
 Club (weapon)

See also
 COSHH (Control of Substances Hazardous to Health Regulations 2002), a set of UK regulations
 Kosh (disambiguation)
 Chemical cosh, describing a sedative drug
 Cosh Boy, a 1953 British film
 Harry and Cosh, a British children's television series